Kladnart is a small settlement in the Municipality of Vojnik in eastern Slovenia. It has a relatively remote location in the hills east of Vojnik and a permanent population of only six (2002 statistics). The area is part of the traditional region of Styria. It is now included with the rest of the municipality in the Savinja Statistical Region.

References

External links
Kladnart at Geopedia

Populated places in the Municipality of Vojnik